It is known by a collection of names including: Saint Sylvester's Day, New Year's Eve or Old Year’s Day/Night, as the following day is New Year's Day. It is the last day of the year; the following day is January 1, the first day of the following year.

Events

Pre-1600
 406 – Vandals, Alans and Suebians cross the Rhine, beginning an invasion of Gaul.
 535 – Byzantine general Belisarius completes the conquest of Sicily, defeating the Gothic garrison of Palermo (Panormos), and ending his consulship for the year.
 870 – Battle of Englefield: The Vikings clash with ealdorman Æthelwulf of Berkshire. The invaders are driven back to Reading (East Anglia); many Danes are killed.
1105 – Holy Roman Emperor Henry IV is forced to abdicate in favor of his son, Henry V, in Ingelheim.
1225 – The Lý dynasty of Vietnam ends after 216 years by the enthronement of the boy emperor Trần Thái Tông, husband of the last Lý monarch, Lý Chiêu Hoàng, starting the Trần dynasty.
1229 – James I the Conqueror, King of Aragon, enters Medina Mayurqa (now known as Palma, Spain), thus consummating the Christian reconquest of the island of Majorca.
1501 – The First Battle of Cannanore commences, seeing the first use of the naval line of battle.
1600 – The British East India Company is chartered.

1601–1900
1660 – James II of England is named Duke of Normandy by Louis XIV of France.
1670 – The expedition of John Narborough leaves Corral Bay, having surveyed the coast and lost four hostages to the Spanish.
1687 – The first Huguenots set sail from France to the Cape of Good Hope.
1757 – Empress Elizabeth I of Russia issues her ukase incorporating Königsberg into Russia.
1759 – Arthur Guinness signs a 9,000-year lease at £45 per annum and starts brewing Guinness.
1775 – American Revolutionary War: Battle of Quebec: British forces repulse an attack by Continental Army General Richard Montgomery.
1790 – Efimeris, the oldest Greek newspaper of which issues have survived till today, is published for the first time.
1796 – The incorporation of Baltimore as a city.
1831 – Gramercy Park is deeded to New York City.
1853 – A dinner party is held inside a life-size model of an iguanodon created by Benjamin Waterhouse Hawkins and Sir Richard Owen in south London, England.
1857 – Queen Victoria chooses Ottawa, then a small logging town, as the capital of the Province of Canada.
1862 – American Civil War: Abraham Lincoln signs an act that admits West Virginia to the Union, thus dividing Virginia in two.
  1862   – American Civil War: The Battle of Stones River begins near Murfreesboro, Tennessee.
1878 – Karl Benz, working in Mannheim, Germany, files for a patent on his first reliable two-stroke gas engine. He was granted the patent in 1879.
1879 – Thomas Edison demonstrates incandescent lighting to the public for the first time, in Menlo Park, New Jersey.

1901–present
1906 – Mozaffar ad-Din Shah Qajar signs the Persian Constitution of 1906.
1942 – USS Essex, first aircraft carrier of a 24-ship class, is commissioned.
  1942   – World War II: The Royal Navy defeats the Kriegsmarine at the Battle of the Barents Sea. This leads to the resignation of Grand Admiral Erich Raeder a month later 
  1944   – World War II: Operation Nordwind, the last major Wehrmacht offensive on the Western Front, begins.
1946 – President Harry S. Truman officially proclaims the end of hostilities in World War II.
1951 – Cold War: The Marshall Plan expires after distributing more than US$13.3 billion in foreign aid to rebuild Western Europe.
1955 – General Motors becomes the first U.S. corporation to make over US$1 billion in a year.
1956 – The Romanian Television network begins its first broadcast in Bucharest.
1961 – RTÉ, Ireland's state broadcaster, launches its first national television service.
1963 – The Central African Federation officially collapses, subsequently becoming Zambia, Malawi and Rhodesia.
1965 – Jean-Bédel Bokassa, leader of the Central African Republic army, and his military officers begin a coup d'état against the government of President David Dacko.
1968 – The first flight of the Tupolev Tu-144, the first civilian supersonic transport in the world.
  1968   – MacRobertson Miller Airlines Flight 1750 crashes near Port Hedland, Western Australia, killing all 26 people on board.
1981 – A coup d'état in Ghana removes President Hilla Limann's PNP government and replaces it with the Provisional National Defence Council led by Flight lieutenant Jerry Rawlings.
1983 – The AT&T Bell System is broken up by the United States Government.
  1983   – Benjamin Ward is appointed New York City Police Department's first ever African American police commissioner.
  1983   – In Nigeria, a coup d'état led by Major General Muhammadu Buhari ends the Second Nigerian Republic.
1991 – All official Soviet Union institutions have ceased operations by this date, five days after the Soviet Union is officially dissolved.
1992 – Czechoslovakia is peacefully dissolved in what is dubbed by media as the Velvet Divorce, resulting in the creation of the Czech Republic and the Slovak Republic.
1994 – This date is skipped altogether in Kiribati as the Phoenix Islands and Line Islands change time zones from UTC−11:00 to UTC+13:00 and UTC−10:00 to UTC+14:00, respectively.
  1994   – The First Chechen War: The Russian Ground Forces begin a New Year's storming of Grozny.
1998 – The European Exchange Rate Mechanism freezes the values of the legacy currencies in the Eurozone, and establishes the value of the euro currency.
1999 – The first President of Russia, Boris Yeltsin, resigns from office, leaving Prime Minister Vladimir Putin as the acting President and successor.
  1999   – The U.S. government hands control of the Panama Canal (as well all the adjacent land to the canal known as the Panama Canal Zone) to Panama. This act complied with the signing of the 1977 Torrijos–Carter Treaties.
  1999   – Indian Airlines Flight 814 hijacking ends after seven days with the release of 190 survivors at Kandahar Airport, Afghanistan.
2000 – The last day of the 20th Century and 2nd Millennium. 
2009 – Both a blue moon and a lunar eclipse occur.
2010 – Tornadoes touch down in midwestern and southern United States, including Washington County, Arkansas; Greater St. Louis, Sunset Hills, Missouri, Illinois, and Oklahoma, with a few tornadoes in the early hours. A total of 36 tornadoes touched down, resulting in the deaths of nine people and $113 million in damages.
2011 – NASA succeeds in putting the first of two Gravity Recovery and Interior Laboratory satellites in orbit around the Moon.
2014 – A New Year's Eve celebration stampede in Shanghai kills at least 36 people and injures 49 others.
2015 – A fire breaks out at the Downtown Address Hotel in Downtown Dubai, United Arab Emirates, located near the Burj Khalifa, two hours before the fireworks display is due to commence. Sixteen injuries were reported; one had a heart attack, another suffered a major injury, and fourteen others with minor injuries.
2018 – Thirty-nine people are killed after a ten-story building collapses in the industrial city of Magnitogorsk, Russia.
2019 – The World Health Organization is informed of cases of pneumonia with an unknown cause, detected in Wuhan. This later turned out to be COVID-19, the cause of the COVID-19 pandemic.
2020 – The World Health Organization issues its first emergency use validation for a COVID-19 vaccine.

Births

Pre-1600
 695 – Muhammad ibn al-Qasim, Umayyad general (d. 715)
1378 – Pope Callixtus III (d. 1458)
1491 – Jacques Cartier, French navigator and explorer (d. 1557)
1493 – Eleonora Gonzaga, Duchess of Urbino (d. 1570)
1504 – Beatrice of Portugal, Duchess of Savoy (d. 1538)
1514 – Andreas Vesalius, Belgian anatomist, physician, and author (d. 1564)
1539 – John Radcliffe, English politician (d. 1568)
1550 – Henry I, Duke of Guise (d. 1588)
1552 – Simon Forman, English occultist and astrologer (d. 1611)
1572 – Emperor Go-Yōzei of Japan, (d. 1617)
1585 – Gonzalo Fernández de Córdoba, Spanish general and politician, 24th Governor of the Duchy of Milan (d. 1645)

1601–1900
1668 – Herman Boerhaave, Dutch botanist and physician (d. 1738)
1714 – Arima Yoriyuki, Japanese mathematician and educator (d. 1783)
1720 – Charles Edward Stuart, Scottish claimant to the throne of England (d. 1788)
1738 – Charles Cornwallis, 1st Marquess Cornwallis, English general and politician, 3rd Governor-General of India (d. 1805)
1741 – Gottfried August Bürger, German poet and academic (d. 1794)
1763 – Pierre-Charles Villeneuve, French admiral (d. 1806)
1776 – Johann Spurzheim, German-American physician and phrenologist (d. 1832)
1798 – Friedrich Robert Faehlmann, Estonian physician, philologist, and academic (d. 1850)
1805 – Marie d'Agoult, German-French historian and author (d. 1876)
1815 – George Meade, American general and engineer (d. 1872)
1830 – Isma'il Pasha, Egyptian ruler (d. 1895)
  1830   – Alexander Smith, Scottish poet and critic (d. 1867)
1833 – Hugh Nelson Scottish-Australian politician, 11th Premier of Queensland (d. 1906)
1834 – Queen Kapiolani of Hawaii (d. 1899)
1838 – Émile Loubet, French lawyer and politician, 7th President of France (d. 1929)
1842 – Giovanni Boldini, Italian painter (d. 1931)
1851 – Henry Carter Adams, American economist and academic (d. 1921)
1855 – Giovanni Pascoli, Italian poet and scholar (d. 1912)
1857 – King Kelly, American baseball player and manager (d. 1894)
1860 – Joseph S. Cullinan, American businessman, co-founded Texaco (d. 1937)
1864 – Robert Grant Aitken, American astronomer and academic (d. 1951)
1869 – Henri Matisse, French painter and sculptor (d. 1954)
1872 – Fred Marriott, American race car driver (d. 1956)
1873 – Konstantin Konik, Estonian surgeon and politician, 19th Estonian Minister of Education (d. 1936)
1874 – Julius Meier, American businessman and politician, 20th Governor of Oregon (d. 1937)
1877 – Lawrence Beesley, English journalist and author (d. 1967)
1878 – Elizabeth Arden, Canadian businesswoman, founded Elizabeth Arden, Inc. (d. 1966)
  1878   – Horacio Quiroga, Uruguayan-Argentinian author, poet, and playwright (d. 1937)
1880 – Fred Beebe, American baseball player and coach (d. 1957)
  1880   – George Marshall, American general and politician, 50th United States Secretary of State, Nobel Prize laureate (d. 1959)
1881 – Max Pechstein, German painter and academic (d. 1955)
1884 – Bobby Byrne, American baseball and soccer player (d. 1964)
  1884   – Mihály Fekete, Hungarian actor, screenwriter, and film director (d. 1960)
1885 – Princess Victoria Adelaide of Schleswig-Holstein (d. 1970)
1899 – Silvestre Revueltas, Mexican violinist, composer, and conductor (d. 1940)

1901–present
1901 – Karl-August Fagerholm, Finnish politician, valtioneuvos, the Speaker of the Parliament and the Prime Minister of Finland (d. 1984)
  1901   – Nikos Ploumpidis, Greek educator and politician (d. 1954)
1902 – Lionel Daunais, Canadian singer-songwriter (d. 1982)
  1902   – Roy Goodall, English footballer (d. 1982)
1903 – William Heynes, English engineer (d. 1989)
1905 – Helen Dodson Prince, American astronomer and academic (d. 2002)
  1905   – Jule Styne, English-American composer (d. 1994)
1908 – Simon Wiesenthal, Ukrainian-Austrian Nazi hunter and author (d. 2005)
1909 – Jonah Jones, American trumpet player and saxophonist (d. 2000)
1910 – Carl Dudley, American director, producer, and screenwriter (d. 1973)
  1910   – Enrique Maier, Spanish tennis player (d. 1981)
1911 – Dal Stivens, Australian soldier and author (d. 1997)
1912 – John Frost, Indian-English general (d. 1993)
1914 – Mary Logan Reddick, American neuroembryologist (d. 1966)
1915 – Sam Ragan, American journalist, author, and poet (d. 1996)
1917 – Evelyn Knight, American singer (d. 2007)
  1917   – Wilfrid Noyce, English mountaineer and author (d. 1962)
1918 – Ray Graves, American football player and coach (d. 2015)
1919 – Tommy Byrne, American baseball player, coach, and politician (d. 2007)
  1919   – Carmen Contreras-Bozak, Puerto Rican-American soldier (d. 2017) 
1920 – Rex Allen, American actor and singer-songwriter (d. 1999) 
1922 – Tomás Balduino, Brazilian bishop (d. 2014)
  1922   – Halina Czerny-Stefańska, Polish pianist and educator (d. 2001)
  1922   – Luis Zuloaga, Venezuelan baseball player (d. 2013)
1923 – Giannis Dalianidis, Greek actor, director, and screenwriter (d. 2010)
1924 – Taylor Mead, American actor and poet (d. 2013)
1925 – Irina Korschunow, German author and screenwriter (d. 2013)
  1925   – Sri Lal Sukla, Indian author (d. 2011)
  1925   – Daphne Oram, British composer and electronic musician (d. 2003)
1926 – Valerie Pearl, English historian and academic (d. 2016)
  1926   – Billy Snedden, Australian lawyer and politician, 17th Attorney-General for Australia (d. 1987)
1928 – Ross Barbour, American pop singer (d. 2011)
  1928   – Hugh McElhenny, American football player (d. 2022)
  1928   – Veijo Meri, Finnish author and translator (d. 2015)
  1928   – Tatyana Shmyga, Russian actress and singer (d. 2011) 
  1928   – Siné, French cartoonist (d. 2016)
1929 – Mies Bouwman, Dutch television host (d. 2018)
  1929   – Peter May, English cricketer (d. 1994)
1930 – Odetta, American singer-songwriter, guitarist, and actress (d. 2008)
  1930   – Jaime Escalante, Bolivian-American educator (d. 2010)
1931 – Bob Shaw, Northern Irish journalist and author (d. 1996)
1932 – Don James, American football player and coach (d. 2013)
  1932   – Felix Rexhausen, German journalist and author (d. 1992)
1933 – Edward Bunker, American author, screenwriter, and actor (d. 2005)
1934 – Ameer Muhammad Akram Awan, Indian author, poet, and scholar (d. 2017)
1935 – Salman of Saudi Arabia, King of Saudi Arabia
1937 – Avram Hershko, Hungarian-Israeli biochemist and physician, Nobel Prize laureate
  1937   – Anthony Hopkins, Welsh actor, director, and composer
  1937   – Barry Hughes, Welsh footballer and manager (d. 2019)
  1937   – Tess Jaray, Austrian-English painter and educator
1938 – Rosalind Cash, American singer and actress (d. 1995)
  1938   – Atje Keulen-Deelstra, Dutch speed skater (d. 2013)
1939 – Willye White, American sprinter and long jumper (d. 2007)
1940 – Mani Neumeier, German drummer
1941 – Alex Ferguson, Scottish footballer and manager
  1941   – Sarah Miles, English actress
1942 – Andy Summers, English guitarist, songwriter, and producer
1943 – John Denver, American singer-songwriter, guitarist, and actor (d. 1997)
  1943   – Ben Kingsley, English actor
  1943   – Pete Quaife, English bass player, author, and artist (d. 2010)
1944 – Taylor Hackford, American director, producer, and screenwriter
1945 – Connie Willis, American author
1946 – Roy Greenslade, English journalist and academic
  1946   – Bryan Hamilton, Northern Irish footballer and coach
  1946   – Raphael Kaplinsky, South African international development academic
  1946   – Pius Ncube, Zimbabwean archbishop
  1946   – Lyudmila Pakhomova, Russian ice dancer (d. 1986)
  1946   – Cliff Richey, American tennis player
  1946   – Eric Robson, Scottish journalist and author
  1946   – Nigel Rudd, English businessman, founded Williams Holdings
  1946   – Tim Stevens, English bishop
  1946   – Diane von Fürstenberg, Belgian-American fashion designer
1947 – Burton Cummings, Canadian singer-songwriter and keyboard player
  1947   – Rita Lee, Brazilian singer-songwriter, guitarist, and actress
  1947   – Tim Matheson, American actor, director, and producer
1948 – Joe Dallesandro, American actor
  1948   – Sandy Jardine, Scottish footballer and manager (d. 2014)
  1948   – Donna Summer, American singer-songwriter (d. 2012)
1949 – Ellen Datlow, American anthologist and author
  1949   – Flora Gomes, Bissau-Guinean filmmaker
  1949   – Susan Shwartz, American author
1950 – Bob Gilder, American golfer
  1950   – Inge Helten, German sprinter
  1950   – Cheryl Womack, American businesswoman
1951 – Tom Hamilton, American bass player and songwriter 
  1951   – Kenny Roberts, American motorcycle racer
1952 – Vaughan Jones, New Zealand mathematician and academic (d. 2020)
  1952   – Jean-Pierre Rives, French rugby player, painter, and sculptor
1953 – Jane Badler, American actress
1954 – Alex Salmond, Scottish economist and politician, First Minister of Scotland
  1954   – Hermann Tilke, German racing driver, architect and engineer
1956 – Robert Goodwill, English farmer and politician
  1956   – Helma Knorscheidt, German shot putter
  1956   – Steve Rude, American author and illustrator
1958 – Geoff Marsh, Australian cricketer and coach
  1958   – Bebe Neuwirth, American actress and dancer
1959 – Liveris Andritsos, Greek basketball player
  1959   – Val Kilmer, American actor
  1959   – Phill Kline, American lawyer and politician, Kansas Attorney General
  1959   – Baron Waqa, Nauruan composer and politician, 14th President of Nauru
  1959   – Paul Westerberg, American singer-songwriter and guitarist
1960 – Steve Bruce, English footballer and manager
1961 – Rick Aguilera, American baseball player and coach
  1961   – Jeremy Heywood, English economist and civil servant (d. 2018)
  1961   – Nina Li Chi, Hong Kong actress
1962 – Tyrone Corbin, American basketball player and coach
  1962   – Chris Hallam, English-Welsh swimmer and wheelchair racer (d. 2013)
  1962   – Jennifer Higdon, American composer
1963 – Scott Ian, American singer-songwriter and guitarist
1964 – Winston Benjamin, Antiguan cricketer
  1964   – Michael McDonald, American comedian, actor, and director
1965 – Tony Dorigo, Australian-English footballer and sportscaster
  1965   – Julie Doucet, Canadian cartoonist and author
  1965   – Gong Li, Chinese actress
  1965   – Laxman Sivaramakrishnan, Indian cricketer
  1965   – Nicholas Sparks, American author, screenwriter, and producer
1967 – Paul McGregor, Australian rugby league player and coach
1968 – Gerry Dee, Canadian comedian, actor, and screenwriter
  1968   – Junot Diaz, Dominican-born American novelist, short story writer, and essayist
1970 – Jorge Alberto da Costa Silva, Brazilian footballer
  1970   – Danny McNamara, English singer-songwriter
  1970   – Carlos Morales Quintana, Spanish-Danish architect and sailor
  1970   – Bryon Russell, American basketball player
1971 – Brent Barry, American basketball player and sportscaster
  1971   – Esteban Loaiza, Mexican baseball player
1972 – Grégory Coupet, French footballer
  1972   – Joey McIntyre, American singer-songwriter and actor
  1972   – Scott Manley, Scottish YouTube personality
1973 – Shandon Anderson, American basketball player
  1973   – Malcolm Middleton, Scottish singer-songwriter and guitarist
  1973   – Curtis Myden, Canadian swimmer
1974 – Joe Abercrombie, English author
  1974   – Mario Aerts, Belgian cyclist
  1974   – Tony Kanaan, Brazilian race car driver
  1974   – Ryan Sakoda, Japanese-American wrestler and trainer
1975 – Rami Alanko, Finnish ice hockey player
  1975   – Toni Kuivasto, Finnish footballer and coach
  1975   – Rob Penders, Dutch footballer
  1975   – Sander Schutgens, Dutch runner
1976 – Luís Carreira, Portuguese motorcycle racer (d. 2012)
  1976   – Matthew Hoggard, English cricketer
1977 – Wardy Alfaro, Costa Rican footballer and coach
  1977   – Psy, South Korean musician
  1977   – Donald Trump Jr., American businessman and son of U.S. President Donald Trump
1979 – Paul O'Neill, English racing driver
  1979   – Jeff Waldstreicher, American lawyer and politician
1980 – Jesse Carlson, American baseball player
  1980   – Matt Cross, American wrestler
  1980   – Richie McCaw, New Zealand rugby player
  1980   – Carsten Schlangen, German runner
1981 – Jason Campbell, American football player
  1981   – Matthew Pavlich, Australian footballer
  1981   – Margaret Simpson, Ghanaian heptathlete
  1981   – Ricky Whittle, English actor
1982 – Julio DePaula, Dominican baseball player
  1982   – Craig Gordon, Scottish footballer
  1982   – Luke Schenscher, Australian basketball player
  1982   – The Rocket Summer, American singer-songwriter, guitarist, and producer
1984 – Ben Hannant, Australian rugby league player
  1984   – Édgar Lugo, Mexican footballer 
  1984   – Calvin Zola, Congolese footballer
1985 – Jonathan Horton, American gymnast
  1985   – Jan Smit, Dutch singer and television host
1986 – Nate Freiman, American baseball player
  1986   – Kade Snowden, Australian rugby league player
1987 – Javaris Crittenton, American basketball player
  1987   – Danny Holla, Dutch footballer
  1987   – Nemanja Nikolić, Hungarian footballer
1990 – Patrick Chan, Canadian figure skater
  1991   – ND Stevenson, American cartoonist
1992 – Amy Cure, Australian track cyclist
  1992   – Karl Kruuda, Estonian racing driver
1995 – Gabby Douglas, American gymnast
2000 – Alycia Parks, American tennis player
2001 – Katie Volynets, American tennis player

Deaths

Pre-1600
45 BC – Quintus Fabius Maximus, consul suffectus
 192 – Commodus, Roman emperor (b. 161)
 335 – Pope Sylvester I
 669 – Li Shiji, Chinese general (b. 594) 
 914 – Ibn Hawshab, founder of the Isma'ili community in Yemen
1032 – Ahmad Maymandi, Persian statesman, vizier of the Ghaznavid Empire
1164 – Ottokar III of Styria (b. 1124)
1194 – Leopold V, Duke of Austria (b. 1157)
1298 – Humphrey de Bohun, 3rd Earl of Hereford, English politician, Lord High Constable of England (b. 1249)
1299 – Margaret, Countess of Anjou (b. 1273)
1302 – Frederick III, Duke of Lorraine (b. 1238)
1384 – John Wycliffe, English philosopher, theologian, and translator (b. 1331)
1386 – Johanna of Bavaria, Queen of Bohemia (b. c. 1362)
1426 – Thomas Beaufort, Duke of Exeter (b. 1377)
1439 – Margaret Holland, English noblewoman (b. 1385)
1460 – Richard Neville, 5th Earl of Salisbury, English politician, Lord Chancellor of the United Kingdom (b. 1400)
1510 – Bianca Maria Sforza, Holy Roman Empress (b. 1472)
1535 – William Skeffington, English-Irish politician, Lord Deputy of Ireland (b. 1465)
1568 – Shimazu Tadayoshi, Japanese daimyō (b. 1493)
1575 – Pierino Belli, Italian commander and jurist (b. 1502)
1583 – Thomas Erastus, Swiss physician and theologian (b. 1524)

1601–1900
1610 – Ludolph van Ceulen, German-Dutch mathematician and academic (b. 1540)
1637 – Christian, Count of Waldeck-Wildungen, German count (b. 1585)
1650 – Dorgon, Chinese emperor (b. 1612)
1655 – Janusz Radziwiłł, Polish–Lithuanian politician (b. 1612)
1673 – Oliver St John, English judge and politician, Chief Justice of the Common Pleas (b. 1598)
1679 – Giovanni Alfonso Borelli, Italian physiologist and physicist (b. 1608)
1691 – Robert Boyle, Anglo-Irish chemist and physicist (b. 1627)
  1691   – Dudley North, English merchant and economist (b. 1641)
1705 – Catherine of Braganza (b. 1638)
1719 – John Flamsteed, English astronomer and academic (b. 1646)
1730 – Carlo Gimach, Maltese architect, engineer and poet (b. 1651)
1742 – Charles III Philip, Elector Palatine (b. 1661)
1775 – Richard Montgomery, American general (b. 1738)
1799 – Jean-François Marmontel, French historian and author (b. 1723)
1818 – Jean-Pierre Duport, French cellist (b. 1741)
1872 – Aleksis Kivi, Finnish author and playwright (b. 1834)
1876 – Catherine Labouré, French nun and saint (b. 1806)
1877 – Gustave Courbet, French-Swiss painter and sculptor (b. 1819)
1888 – Samson Raphael Hirsch, German rabbi and scholar (b. 1808)
1889 – Ion Creangă, Romanian author and educator (b. 1837)
  1889   – George Kerferd, English-Australian politician, 10th Premier of Victoria (b. 1831)
1890 – Pancha Carrasco, Costa Rican soldier (b. 1826)
1891 – Samuel Ajayi Crowther, Nigerian bishop and linguist (b. 1809)
1894 – Thomas Joannes Stieltjes, Dutch mathematician and academic (b. 1856)

1901–present
1909 – Spencer Trask, American financier and philanthropist (b. 1844)
1910 – Archibald Hoxsey, American pilot (b. 1884)
  1910   – John Moisant, American pilot and engineer (b. 1868)
1921 – Boies Penrose, American lawyer and politician (b. 1860)
1934 – Cornelia Clapp, American marine biologist (b. 1849)
1936 – Miguel de Unamuno, Spanish philosopher, author, and poet (b. 1864)
1948 – Malcolm Campbell, English racing driver and journalist (b. 1885)
1949 – Rıza Tevfik Bölükbaşı, Turkish philosopher, poet, and politician (b. 1869)
  1949   – Raimond Valgre, Estonian pianist and composer (b. 1913)
1950 – Charles Koechlin, French composer and educator (b. 1867)
1951 – Murtaza Hasan Chandpuri, Indian Muslim scholar (b. 1868)
1953 – Albert Plesman, Dutch businessman, founded KLM (b. 1889)
1964 – Bobby Byrne, American baseball and soccer player (b. 1884)
  1964   – Ólafur Thors, Icelandic lawyer and politician, 8th Prime Minister of Iceland (b. 1892)
  1964   – Henry Maitland Wilson, English field marshal (b. 1881)
1968 – George Lewis, American clarinet player and composer (b. 1900)
1970 – Cyril Scott, English composer, writer, and poet (b. 1879)
1972 – Roberto Clemente, Puerto Rican-American baseball player and Marine (b. 1934)
  1972   – Henry Gerber, German-American activist, founded the Society for Human Rights (b. 1892)
1978 – Basil Wolverton, American illustrator (b. 1909)
1980 – Marshall McLuhan, Canadian philosopher and theorist (b. 1911)
  1980   – Raoul Walsh, American actor, director, producer, and screenwriter (b. 1887)
1983 – Sevim Burak, Turkish author and playwright (b. 1931)
1985 – Ricky Nelson, American singer-songwriter, guitarist, and actor (b. 1940)
1987 – Jerry Turner, American journalist (b. 1929)
1988 – Nicolas Calas, Greek-American poet and critic (b. 1907)
1990 – George Allen, American football player and coach (b. 1918)
  1990   – Vasily Lazarev, Russian physician, colonel, and astronaut (b. 1928)
  1990   – Giovanni Michelucci, Italian architect and urban planner, designed the Firenze Santa Maria Novella railway station (b. 1891)
1993 – Zviad Gamsakhurdia, Georgian anthropologist and politician, 1st President of Georgia (b. 1939)
  1993   – Brandon Teena, American murder victim (b. 1972)
1994 – Woody Strode, American football player, wrestler, and actor (b. 1914)
1996 – Wesley Addy, American actor (b. 1913)
1997 – Floyd Cramer, American singer-songwriter and pianist (b. 1933)
  1997   – Billie Dove, American actress (b. 1903)
1998 – Ted Glossop, Australian rugby league player and coach (b. 1934)
1999 – Elliot Richardson, American lawyer and politician, 69th United States Attorney General (b. 1920)
1999 – Abul Hasan Ali Nadwi, Indian Muslim scholar and author (b. 1914)
2000 – Alan Cranston, American journalist and politician (b. 1914)
  2000   – José Greco, Italian-American dancer and choreographer (b. 1918)
  2000   – Binyamin Ze'ev Kahane, American-Israeli rabbi and scholar (b. 1966)
2001 – Eileen Heckart, American actress (b. 1919)
2002 – Kevin MacMichael, Canadian guitarist, songwriter, and producer (b. 1951)
2003 – Arthur R. von Hippel German-American physicist and author (b. 1898)
2004 – Gérard Debreu, French economist and mathematician, Nobel Prize laureate (b. 1921)
2005 – Enrico Di Giuseppe, American tenor and educator (b. 1932)
  2005   – Phillip Whitehead, English screenwriter, producer, and politician (b. 1937)
2006 – Ya'akov Hodorov, Israeli footballer (b. 1927)
  2006   – Seymour Martin Lipset, American sociologist, author, and academic (b. 1922)
  2006   – George Sisler, Jr., American businessman (b. 1917)
2007 – Roy Amara, American scientific researcher (b. 1925)
  2007   – Michael Goldberg, American painter and educator (b. 1924)
  2007   – Bill Idelson, American actor, producer, and screenwriter (b. 1919)
  2007   – Milton L. Klein, Canadian lawyer and politician (b. 1910)
  2007   – Ettore Sottsass, Austrian-Italian architect and designer (b. 1917)
2008 – Donald E. Westlake, American author and screenwriter (b. 1933)
2009 – Cahal Daly, Irish cardinal and philosopher (b. 1917)
  2009   – Justin Keating, Irish surgeon, journalist, and politician, Minister for Industry and Commerce (b. 1930)
2010 – Raymond Impanis, Belgian cyclist (b. 1925)
  2010   – Per Oscarsson, Swedish actor, director, producer, and screenwriter (b. 1927)
2012 – Peter Ebert, English director and producer (b. 1918)
  2012   – Tarak Mekki, Tunisian businessman and politician (b. 1958)
  2012   – Jovette Marchessault, Canadian author and playwright (b. 1938)
  2012   – Günter Rössler, German photographer and journalist (b. 1926)
2013 – James Avery, American actor (b. 1945)
  2013   – Roberto Ciotti, Italian guitarist and composer (b. 1953)
  2013   – Bob Grant, American radio host (b. 1929)
  2013   – Irina Korschunow, German author and screenwriter (b. 1925)
2014 – Edward Herrmann, American actor (b. 1943)
  2014   – Abdullah Hussain, Malaysian author (b. 1920)
  2014   – Norm Phelps, American author and activist (b. 1939)
  2014   – S. Arthur Spiegel, American captain, lawyer, and judge (b. 1920)
  2014   – Valerian Wellesley, 8th Duke of Wellington, British soldier and politician (b. 1915)
2015 – Natalie Cole, American singer-songwriter and actress (b. 1950)
  2015   – Wayne Rogers, American actor and investor (b. 1933)
2016 – William Christopher, American actor (b. 1932)
2018 – Kader Khan, Indian actor (b. 1937)
2021 – Betty White, American actress, comedian and producer (b. 1922)
2022 – Pope Benedict XVI, German Roman Catholic cardinal and theologian, pope (2005–2013) and archbishop of Munich and Freising (1977–1982) (b. 1927)
2022 – Barry Lane, English golfer (b. 1960)

Holidays and observances
Christian feast day:
Pope Sylvester I (Catholic Church)
December 31 (Eastern Orthodox liturgics)
International Solidarity Day of Azerbaijanis (Azerbaijan)
New Year's Eve (International observance), and its related observances:
First Night (United States)
Last Day of the Year or Bisperás ng Bagong Taón, special holiday between Rizal Day and New Year's Day (Philippines)
Novy God Eve (Russia) 
Ōmisoka (Japan)
The first day of Hogmanay or "Auld Year's Night" (Scotland)
The seventh of the Twelve Days of Christmas (Western Christianity)
The sixth and penultimate day of Kwanzaa (United States)

See also 
January 0

References

External links

 BBC: On This Day
 
 Historical Events on December 31

Days of the year
December